Ananino is a rural locality (a village) in Gorodetskoye Rural Settlement, Kichmengsko-Gorodetsky District, Vologda Oblast, Russia. The population was 457 as of 2002. There are 6 streets.

Geography 
Ananino is located 2 km southeast of Kichmengsky Gorodok (the district's administrative centre) by road. Kichmengsky Gorodok is the nearest rural locality.

References 

Rural localities in Kichmengsko-Gorodetsky District